Antonio "Toto" Cotogni (1 August 1831 – 15 October 1918) was an Italian baritone of the first magnitude. Regarded internationally as being one of the greatest male opera singers of the 19th century, he was particularly admired by the composer Giuseppe Verdi. Cotogni forged an important second career as a singing teacher after his retirement from the stage in 1894.

Early years and education 

Antonio Cotogni was born in Rome to Agata Fazzini and Raffaele Cotogni, who managed a small majolica plant. He had four siblings: sister Giuditta (who remained unmarried and lived in the family household); brothers Francesco, Andrea (who owned a meat packing business), and Gaspare (later mayor of Melara).

After some initial studies at the Hospice of San Michele, where he was a student of Ludovico Luccesi. He studied music theory at Santa Maria Maggiore under Fontemaggi. Soon after, he began working with Achille Faldi on the study of singing itself. Under his guidance, Cotogni made his first public ventures into solo singing but only in the principal churches of Rome and in small summer music festivals in the small towns of the province, such as Anagni, Valmontone, Subisco, Velletri, and Viterbo.

Early on, Cotogni worked part-time in a majolica plant and did not care much for theater. He had no pretensions for assuming a career there and was content to remain a church singer. He won his first success in 1851 singing Salvatore Capocci's oratorio Il martirio di Sant'Eustachio at the church of Santa Maria in Vallicella.

About his training prior to his Italian stage debut, Cotogni told a former student:

Operatic career

Debut

In 1852, after much insistence from Faldi and castrato Domenico Mustafà, among others, he agreed to sign a contract for his debut at Rome's Teatro Metastasio, as Belcore in L'elisir d'amore. For the next year, he did not sing in public at all but rather studied assiduously with Faldi to build his repertoire. After an initial contract at Spoleto for Il trovatore and Maria di Rohan, he began to pick up consistent work in the Italian regional operatic circuit: Lanciano for Trovatore, Rigoletto, and Maria di Rohan; Orvieto for I masnadieri; Lucrezia Borgia in several cities; I puritani at Perugia.

In the spring of 1857, he was signed by the impresario Jacovacci for Lucia di Lammermoor and Gemma di Vergy at Rome's Teatro Argentina. In September and October of that year, he performed I due Foscari and Luisa Strozzi at Teatro Rossini in Turin. It was then that he met the soprano Maria Ballerini. They married the next year but never had any children together.

Following that, Cotogni was engaged for Foscari and La traviata at Asti and then Cuneo, the Teatro Rossini again, Zara, in Genova, and at Turin for the opening of the new Teatro Alfieri. There he was asked by the impresario Scalaberni to take the place of the famous baritone Felice Varesi in an operatic company being formed for the theater in Nice. During his time in Nice, Cotogni studied the role of Don Giovanni with his predecessor, Italian baritone Antonio Tamburini, who had left the stage in 1855.

Breakthrough

The turning point in Cotogni's career came in late 1858. As soon as he arrived in Nice for rehearsals in October, he began to feel an air of contempt for his presence from everyone from the theater to public restaurants and cafés. Those who knew and loved Varesi felt that Cotogni, an virtually unknown singer, had been hastily and unfairly chosen to replace him. The first role he was engaged to sing was of Antonio in Gaetano Donizetti's Linda di Chamounix in Nice, where the audience greeted him with noises and whistling before he had even opened his mouth. This same audience fell silent during Antonio's opening aria "Ambo nati in queste valle" and gave him a unanimous, colossal applause after the cadenza, demanding a bis. That performance assured his place on the scene and revealed him to be an absolute master of his art—technically, stylistically, and dramatically. Consequently, this became one of Cotogni's signature roles, one by which he made great impressions on all the great theaters of Europe and even the most sullen critics. In Nice, he followed Linda with Gemma di Vergy, Rigoletto, La favorita, Traviata, Trovatore, Don Pasquale, Roberto Devereux, Don Sebastiano, and Il barbiere di Siviglia.

He sang with enormous success over the next year—I lombardi, Rossini's Otello, and Nabucco in Viterbo; again at Nice for Lucia di Lammermoor, Ernani, Trovatore, and Maria di Rohan; and at Barcelona's Teatro Principal for Saffo, Traviata, Attila, Gemma, Barbiere, and Trovatore. By October 1860, Cotogni had sung in 21 theaters, and it was at this point that he reached La Scala, Milan, debuting there in the role of Giovanni Bandino in Bottesini's L'assedio di Firenze. Cotogni had been nervous about this debuting, doubting his ability to do it justice and doubting the power of his voice to be heard in the theater. The reviews of the debut were encouraging, but one or two critics mentioned a certain tremulousness and constriction in his high notes. But Cotogni regained his composure after the premiere, and won over the Milan public with his other roles that season—William Tell, Peri's Vittor Pisani, Rodolfo in La sonnambula, and Ezio in Attila. 

During the ensuing decades, he also appeared at the leading opera houses in Madrid, Lisbon, Paris, London, Moscow, and Saint Petersburg. He became enormously popular with London audiences, performing at the Royal Opera House, Covent Garden, from 1867 to 1889. He sang at Saint Petersburg in 26 successive seasons.

It was in 1894 at Saint Petersburg that he gave his last operatic stage performance, in Donizetti's Don Pasquale. While Cotogni had spent his career singing the opera's baritone role of Dr. Malatesta, the younger baritone Mattia Battistini was now taking over many of the Cotogni's old roles. Nevertheless, Battistini requested Cotogni to honor the company by joining them in one final performance, only this time asking that he sing the lead comic bass role of Don Pasquale, which Cotogni obliged.

Voice teacher 

In retirement, Cotogni became one of the most celebrated vocal teachers in history. At the invitation of Anton Rubinstein, he taught at Saint Petersburg Conservatory (where incidentally he had Sergei Diaghilev as a student) from 1894 to 1898, but he had to abandon this post in consequence of a serious illness, subsequently taking up an appointment in 1899 as a professor at the Accademia di Santa Cecilia in Rome, where his assistant was Enrico Rosati, who was later to become teacher to Beniamino Gigli.

The qualities that made Cotogni revered and beloved in his career on the stage also made him an exceptional teacher, one who went out of his way for his students to give them what they needed musically, artistically, and often materially.

During this time, twelve-year-old Luigi Ricci (who would later become a vocal coach) began accompanying voice lessons given by Cotogni, who had performed several of Verdi's operas under the composer's supervision. At this early age, Ricci began taking meticulous notes on traditions that Cotogni passed on to him from his own work with Verdi and other 19th century composers and conductors information about elements that had been changed in rehearsal and practice but had never been notated officially, as well as traditions of variations and cadenza begun by various singers from the past century. Ricci continued his copious note taking throughout his life and eventually compiled these into a four-part collection entitled Variazioni-cadenze tradizioni per canto (two volumes and two appendices published by Casa Ricordi, 1963).

Cotogni died of old age in Rome less than a month prior to the 1918 armistice that ended World War I. A group of his friends, colleagues, and former students raised money for his tomb. His burial chapel is located at plot 98 in the Pincetto Nuovo section of the Campo Verano cemetery in Rome.

Students & Protégés 
Ricci reports that when in 1912 he attended performances at Moscow's Imperial theater and Zimina Opera, as well as at the Imperial Theater in St. Petersburg, half of the artists on stage had been Cotogni's students. For nearly 20 years, Cotogni dedicated himself to teaching singing. Many artists already in the fullness of their careers also came to study with him at the Liceo and/or learn from him privately.

Voice 

As a child, Cotogni had merely a weak soprano voice, but it did begin to increase in volume and darken, turning later into a contralto voice. As a teenager, his voice finally began to break into that of a young man, and the head music teacher Scardovelli forbade him to sing; Cotogni grudgingly obeyed and was silent for about six months. After this period of rest, he began to find a few notes, then went on to enrich and strengthen his vocal means continuously until the complete development of a nice baritone voice.

Range 

According to his biographer, Cotogni's professional/usable vocal range was from A1 to B4, though a handful of his roles and even his interpolations and cadenzas require a half-step lower—A♭1. According to Ricci, his other noted interpolations include a high G♯ in Posa's romanza "Carlo, ch'è sol il nostro amore" in Don Carlo; high A♭'s in "O de verd'anni miei" and "O sommo Carlo" from Ernani and the end of "Suoni la tromba" in I puritani; and a quick high A♮in a roulade on the word "piacere" in "Largo al factotum" from Il barbiere di Siviglia. He did, however, chide Titta Ruffo for interpolating an unwritten high B♭ in Hamlet. It is therefore unlikely that Cotogni ever sang a note above the high A♮ in public performance. Of physiological interest is the fact that Cotogni suffered from a lateral lisp that affected his speech but that disappeared when he sang.

The famed Italian conductor Toscanini remarked that Cotogni's voice was totally even and that "one didn't hear the transition between the registers... Hearing it, it seemed that everything was natural, while, instead, the poor Cotogni had practiced for years and years to acquire that perfection."

Critical reception 

Journalistic reviews of his performances were often superlative.

Gramophone recording 

Cotogni ranks with his contemporaries Francesco Graziani (baritone),  Jean-Baptiste Faure and Sir Charles Santley as the foremost baritone of his star-studded generation. He "had a very brief and scarcely revealing relationship with the gramophone; at the age of 77... with the tenor Francesco Marconi, he recorded [the] duet 'I mulattieri'" (by Francesco Masini), writes Michael Scott. "Not surprisingly Marconi gets the better of it. Still, however difficult it is to make out Cotogni's contribution, it is all we have left of a singer who for over 40 years dominated the stages in London, Madrid and Lisbon, St. Petersburg and Moscow and throughout Italy."

Two other recordings, at times believed to be of Cotogni, are in fact the voice of tenore robusto Francesco Tamagno's brother, Giovanni. Comparisons of these two recordings—"O casto fior" and Stanislao Gastaldon's "Ti vorrei rapire" (formerly misidentified as "Perché?")—with the Tamagno brothers' recording of the Otello duet "Si pel ciel" reveals the baritone voice to be identical in timbre and production, with its thin and nasal qualities, especially in the passagio. These stand in contradistinction to the voice confirmed to be Cotogni's (the Mulattieri duet), which is noticeably more even, round, and sonorous throughout—even to the two high G naturals that end the refrain. In the Roman school, and in Cotogni's own teaching, any nasality was seen as a defect to be expressly avoided.

Repertoire 

According to his biographer Angelucci, Cotogni sang one hundred fifty-seven works, but the former was only able to cite one hundred and forty-five. Of the other twelve, he could track down neither the title nor the name of the composer.

Cotogni also sang the baritone solo in the "Dies irae" section of Alessandro Busi's Messa da requiem performed in honor of Gioachino Rossini's death on 9 December 1868 at the church of San Giovanni in Monte in Bologna. His delivery of the solo was sublime: "...the audience, who literally filled the church, was so shaken that, forgetting they were in church, they applauded [his solo] wildly." That response was not unfamiliar; when he made his public debut in Sant'Eustachio in 1851, the audience's surprise and enthusiasm toward the young Cotogni's solo was so overwhelming that police had to be called in to restore order.

Legacy
During his career, Cotogni was an especial favorite of Verdi's, who praised him for the beauty, warmth and strength of his voice, as well as for the emotional intensity which he brought to his musical interpretations. He sang most of the major Verdi baritone roles and took part in the first Italian staging of Don Carlo, in Bologna in 1867, under the supervision of the composer. Verdi, wanting to test out the abilities of Cotogni, privately heard him in several of the key pieces from Don Carlo. When rehearsing the phrases leading up to the duet "Dio, che nell'alma infondere", Cotogni deviated from what Verdi had written, and though Verdi remarked on it, he accepted Cotogni's change, saying that it was actually better, with the result that the markings were changed in the new editions of the score. It became well known that Verdi was moved to tears by Cotogni's singing of Rodrigo's death scene at this test rehearsal. Many who knew Cotogni admired him for his almost extreme modesty and humility; Verdi was no different, only teasing him about it with his own nickname for him—mio ignorantino ("my little ignoramus"). Even after his retirement from opera, he continued singing in benefits and concerts, the very last of which was in 1904, when Cotogni was 73.

Cotogni's repertoire comprised between 150 and 160 roles. His operatic triumphs were not confined to Verdi's compositions. He was also an exponent of the elegant but technically demanding bel canto music of Gioachino Rossini, Gaetano Donizetti, Vincenzo Bellini, and Saverio Mercadante. He sang roles from the new Italian verismo literature, the French grand opera tradition, and some Wagner. He was considered a Mozart specialist and keeper of some traditions of his works, even at a time when Mozart's works were not popular. He was particularly proud of his Don Giovanni, a role that he learned from his predecessor, the Italian baritone Antonio Tamburini, and which Cotogni then passed on to the inheritor of his traditions, Mattia Battistini.

Cotogni sang in the company of many of the most famous opera singers of his time—sopranos Adelina Patti, Teresa Stolz, Thérèse Tietjens, Marcella Sembrich, Christina Nilsson, Emma Albani, and Gemma Bellincioni; castrato Alessandro Moreschi; the Marchisio sisters; contralto Sofia Scalchi; tenors Mario, Francesco Marconi, Julián Gayarre, Angelo Masini, Pietro Mongini,  Lodovico Graziani, Enrico Tamberlick, and Francesco Tamagno; baritones Charles Santley, Jean-Baptiste Faure, Francesco Graziani, Leone Giraldoni, and Mattia Battistini; and basses Foli, Eraclito Bagagiolo, and Édouard de Reszke.

Notes

References

Sources 
 Nino Angelucci, Ricordi di una artista, Antonio Cotogni (Roma, 1907). 
 Roland Mancini and Jean-Jacques Rouveroux,  (orig. H. Rosenthal and J. Warrack, French edition), Guide de l'opéra, Les indispensables de la musique (Fayard, 1995). 
 Arthur Eaglefield Hull (Ed.), A Dictionary of Modern Music and Musicians (Dent, London and Toronto 1924).

External links 

 
 Associazione Culturale Antonio Cotogni

19th-century Italian male opera singers
Italian operatic baritones
Academic staff of the Accademia Nazionale di Santa Cecilia
1831 births
1918 deaths
Singers from Rome
Academic staff of Saint Petersburg Conservatory
Voice teachers